A tea gown or tea-gown is a woman's dress for informal entertaining at home. These dresses, which became popular around the mid-19th century, are characterized by unstructured lines and light fabrics. Early tea gowns were a European development influenced by Asian clothing and historical approach from the 18th century which led to the renaissance time period of long and flowing sleeves. Part of this European sense of fashion came from the Japanese kimono.

Tea gowns were intended to be worn without a corset or assistance from the maid; however, elegance always came first.

During the 19th century, it was not appropriate for women to be seen in public wearing a tea gown. They were intended to be worn indoors with family and close friends during a dinner party.

Although tea gowns were meant for midday wear, they could be worn into the evening. Women started wearing tea gowns in the evening for dinner or certain events at home with close friends and family by 1900. Tea gowns intended for day wear usually had high necks, while evening tea gowns had lower necks.

"Emily Post’s book, Etiquette in Society, in Business, in Politics, and at Home, contains some fascinating information on tea gowns; in fact, her introduction on tea gowns reads like a 19th Century novel."

Notes

References

Takeda, Sharon Sadako, and Kaye Durland Spilker, Fashioning Fashion: European Dress in Detail, 1700 - 1915, LACMA/Prestel USA (2010), 

History of clothing (Western fashion)
19th-century fashion
20th-century fashion
Dresses